"Fantasy" is a song by the American singer-songwriter Mariah Carey. It was released on August 23, 1995, by Columbia Records as the lead single from her fifth album, Daydream (1995). The track was written and produced by Carey and Dave Hall. It samples Tom Tom Club's 1981 song "Genius of Love". The lyrics describe a woman who is in love with a man, and how every time she sees him she starts fantasizing about an impossible relationship with him. The remix for the song features rap verses from Ol' Dirty Bastard, something Carey arranged to assist in her crossover into the hip-hop market and credited for introducing R&B and hip hop collaboration into mainstream pop culture, and for popularizing rap as a featuring act.

"Fantasy" received critical acclaim, with reviewers praising its production, lyrics, Carey's vocal performance and musical progression. The song became a global success, topping the charts in Australia, Canada, New Zealand, and the United States, and reaching the top-ten in thirteen countries. In the US, "Fantasy" became the first song by a female artist, and second overall to debut atop the Billboard Hot 100, topping the chart for eight consecutive weeks. Additionally, it became Carey's ninth number one on the chart.

Carey sang "Fantasy" live on several television and award show appearances around the world. She performed the song at the 23rd American Music Awards, held on January 29, 1996. Additionally, it was performed live on British music chart program Top of the Pops and on French television. "Fantasy" was part of the set-lists on several of Carey's succeeding tours, making its debut during the album's accompanying set of concerts, the Daydream World Tour and is featured on her compilation albums, #1's (1998), Greatest Hits (2001), The Remixes (2003), Playlist: The Very Best of Mariah Carey (2010) and #1 to Infinity (2015).

The cover of the single was shot by top fashion photographer Steven Meisel. Its parent album Daydream uses a cropped version of the single cover. Carey directed the music video for "Fantasy", making it her directorial debut. She created the video's concept and chose the filming location. After being disappointed with the final result in many of her previous videos, Carey decided to single-handedly direct the video. The video showed her rollerblading through Playland Amusement Park in Rye, New York, singing and enjoying herself. The video concludes with Carey dancing atop the sunroof of a car, with many others present and enjoying the music and celebration.

Background 
With Daydream, Carey began incorporating urban R&B and hip hop into her music, something very noticeable in "Fantasy". After Carey began writing songs for her new album Daydream, she decided to include the hook from the Tom Tom Club song "Genius of Love" into an up-tempo song. Afterwards, Carey and Hall began incorporating the sample into the lyrics and melody she had already produced. Carey described how the idea to sample the song became a reality:
I was listening to the radio and heard 'Genius of Love', and I hadn't heard it in a long time. It reminded me of growing up and listening to the radio and that feeling the song gave me seemed to go with the melody and basic idea I had for "Fantasy". I initially told Dave about the idea, and we did it. We called up the Tom Tom Club and they were really into it.

Carey recalled how the writers of the song were really intrigued by the idea of Carey sampling the song, and immediately signed over the rights. After Carey presented Hall with the sample, the chorus and beat, he developed a familiar groove that he felt would "highlight Carey's voice." After they completed the song, Carey's husband and CEO of Columbia, Tommy Mottola listened to "Fantasy" and agreed to include it on the album. The cover of the single was shot by top fashion photographer Steven Meisel. A cropped version of the photograph was used as the album cover as well. Hall described his experience with writing the song with Carey:
[It] was a fun song to do. Mariah brought me 'Genius of Love' and I laid some strings on it and put it into a groove I felt really fit and highlighted her voice. And that song didn't take us but a minute to do, because she really busted that out within two days. We did a rough copy and let Tommy Mottola hear it and he loved it, so all we had to do was bring it back in and mix it.

Composition 

"Fantasy" is an up-tempo song with contemporary R&B and dance-pop genres within its composition, which blends elements of funk music, hip hop, and bubblegum pop. "Fantasy" moves at a "moderate dance tempo" of 104 beats per minute. The remix, which features rap verses from O.D.B., also incorporates hip-hop into the bridge. The song uses heavy bass and percussion, as well as a sample from "Genius of Love" by Tom Tom Club. Carey's vocal range spans three octaves from the low note of E3 to the high note of E6. The song contains choral lyrics written by Carey, who also developed the song's melody and original beat. Instrumentation and production was performed by Dave Hall, while co-arranging and producing the track as well. The members of the Tom Tom Club, Tina Weymouth, Chris Frantz, Steven Stanley and Adrian Belew are all credited as writers due to the inclusion of the music sample they wrote.

Critical reception 

Upon its release, "Fantasy" garnered acclaim from contemporary music critics. Bill Lamb from About.com was very positive on the song, calling it "truly inspiring" and a "career high water mark" for Carey. Stephen Thomas Erlewine from AllMusic also praised the song, saying "Carey continues to perfect her craft and that she has earned her status as an R&B/pop diva." Stephen Holden from The New York Times gave the song praise, writing "with 'Fantasy', Ms. Carey glides confidently into the territory where gospel-flavored pop-soul meets light hip-hop and recorded some of the most gorgeously spun choral music to be found on a contemporary album." Additionally, he claimed "Fantasy" held some of the album's best moments, writing "she continues to make pop music as deliciously enticing as the best moments of "Fantasy". Slant Magazine ranked the song at number sixty on their "Best Singles of the '90s" list, writing it is "escapism perfected, [a] summer bubblegum gem with a sweet, flawless vocal line driven by a diva in her prime."

Chart performance 
"Fantasy" was a massive global success upon its release. The song became Carey's ninth number one single on the US Billboard Hot 100 chart. It became the first single by a female artist to open atop the chart, and only the second single to do so after "You Are Not Alone" by Michael Jackson. It debuted at number one due to strong airplay and sales of 229,000 copies, the highest since Whitney Houston's "I Will Always Love You in January 1993. It spent eight weeks at the top of the chart, from the charts dated September 30 to November 18, 1995, Carey's longest stay at the time alongside "Dreamlover" (1993). It replaced "Gangsta's Paradise" by Coolio, and was replaced by Whitney Houston's "Exhale (Shoop Shoop)", which also debuted atop the Hot 100. "Fantasy" spent 23 weeks in the top 40 and was successful on other Billboard formats, including the R&B and dance charts. The song debuted at number 11 on the Mainstream R&B/Hip-Hop  chart, setting a record at the time for the charts highest debut which would eventually be surpassed by Drake's "Nice for What" in 2018. Its strong sales led it to be certified quintuple-platinum by the Recording Industry Association of America (RIAA), Carey's first single to do so. "Fantasy" was the second best-selling single of 1995 in the US, with sales of 1,500,000. It was ranked seventh on the Hot 100 year-end charts for 1995 and 49th on the 1996 year-end charts. "Fantasy" ranked at number 15 on the Hot 100 decade-end chart for the 1990s.

In Australia, the song topped the chart and was certified triple-platinum by the Australian Recording Industry Association (ARIA). In Canada, the song debuted on the RPM Singles Chart at number 95 on the RPM issue dated October 2, 1995, and reached the top of the chart on November 20, 1995. It was present on the chart for a total of 20 weeks, and ranked 18 on the RPM Year-end chart for 1995. "Fantasy" also reached the top 10 in most countries across Europe, and the top 20 on the Oricon chart in Japan. It peaked within the top-five in Belgium (Wallonia), Finland, France and the United Kingdom; and in the top 10 in Belgium (Flanders), The Netherlands, Ireland, Norway and Switzerland. "Fantasy" was certified silver in France and platinum in the United Kingdom, by the Syndicat National de l'Édition Phonographique (SNEP) and British Phonographic Industry (BPI), respectively. According to the Official Charts Company, the song has sold 400,000 copies in the United Kingdom. The song also topped the charts in New Zealand, where it was certified platinum by the Recording Industry Association of New Zealand (RIANZ).

Remixes 

Carey worked with producer Puff Daddy to create the official remix, the Bad Boy remix of "Fantasy". While Columbia allowed Carey more leniency with the music she recorded, they became hesitant when she featured O.D.B. in the remix for "Fantasy". They feared the sudden change was completely left field for her music, and worried it would jeopardize the album's success. Finally, the Bad Boy remix used guest raps from O.D.B. and background vocals by Puff Daddy. Some of the song's R&B elements were removed for the remix, while the bassline and "Genius of Love" sample were emphasized and the bridge from the original version was used as the chorus. There is a version omitting Ol' Dirty Bastard's verses. The "Bad Boy Fantasy Remix", combines the chorus from the original version and the chorus of the Bad Boy Remix together, removing Ol' Dirty Bastard's vocals from his 2nd verse.

Carey re-recorded vocals for club remixes of the song by David Morales, titled "Daydream Interlude (Fantasy Sweet Dub Mix)." The Bad Boy remix garnered positive reviews from music critics. Ken Tucker from Entertainment Weekly praised the song, claiming its one of the few tracks where Carey "defines herself." Additionally, he complimented the song, writing "At her best, as she is on this clipped, spunky track, Carey is a disco diva for the '90s, a worthy successor to trailblazing women like Donna Summer and Vicki Sue Robinson, R&B singers with an affinity for the endless groove. Disco? No wonder most rock critics can't get behind her. Party on, Mariah." Carey has stated that the Bad Boy remix contributed to over half of the sales of "Fantasy".

On September 24, 2021, American rapper Latto released "Big Energy", which interpolates "Genius of Love", as "Fantasy" did. On March 28, 2022, Latto released the "Big Energy" remix, which features Mariah Carey herself, along with DJ Khaled, which interpolates "Fantasy".

Accolades

Music video 

The single's music video was the first that Carey directed entirely on her own. Carey had been open about the fact that she had not been happy with some of her previous music videos. She therefore decided to single-handedly direct the video, so the outcome would be to her exact choosing. Carey said her inspiration for the video was to give off a "free and open feeling," trying to portray the freedom she had finally achieved in being allowed to direct her first video. The video for "Fantasy" debuted on September 7, 1995, at the 1995 MTV Video Music Awards. The video begins with Carey rollerblading in front of the boardwalk entrance at Playland amusement park, located in Rye, New York, and riding the Dragon Coaster, the park's signature wooden coaster. The video continues with various snippets of Carey until the end of the second verse. Afterwards, the video switches to a night time scene that involves people dancing in the parking lot and on top cars.
I'd done a lot of videos and wasn't always a hundred percent thrilled. For the most part, I was never thrilled with the results, so I figured I would give directing a shot. It was a pretty simple concept. Most of the scenes were featured at the amusement park, at a late-night outdoor celebration. I was really happy to be able to include O.D.B. in the remix video.
Following in their actions, Carey joins in the festivities and hops atop a car and begins singing and dancing to the strong bass and R&B beat playing from the stereos. The video also contains a scene involving a lovable young girl who tries to emulate Carey and whose character reappears in the video for Carey's single "Shake It Off" (2005). The video shoot took place in mid-August 1995. In the official video for the song's remix, O.D.B. makes a few cameo appearances with a clown, as well as on the Boardwalk during additional scenes with Carey.

On August 21, 2020, the music video of both versions was re-released in a remastered form, in HD quality. Exactly a year later it was uploaded in 4K resolution.

Live performances 

"Fantasy" was performed at the 23rd Annual American Music Awards, where Carey won two of the top awards. For the performance, Carey wore a long black trench coat and matching boots, pants and blouse, and was backed by three background vocalists. Additionally, Carey sang "Fantasy" on the British music chart program Top of the Pops, during a promotional stop in the United Kingdom on September 12, 1995. During its taping, she wore a blue blouse and black jumper. Two days later, Carey appeared on French television where she performed the song alongside several male and female dancers. Carey donned a mid-waist baring white blouse and black leather pants and matching heeled boots. Trey Lorenz and two female back up vocalists were also featured on stage during the show's taping. Aside from live television appearances, the song was performed on several legs of Carey's tours.

"Fantasy" was performed at every show on her Daydream World Tour (1996) set to the album version. The performance was tuned similarly to Carey's recital at the American Music Awards, featuring a similar outfit, dance routines and set up. The remix version was performed on her Butterfly World Tour (1998), Rainbow World Tour (2000), Charmbracelet World Tour: An Intimate Evening with Mariah Carey (2003–2004), The Adventures of Mimi Tour (2006), The Elusive Chanteuse Show (2014) and Caution World Tour (2019), each of which featured a varying synopsis. In 1998, it became the first time Carey performed the remix version in concert, placing a large projection screen on to the stage, and featuring snippets and cuts of Ol' Dirty Bastard throughout the video. Additionally, Carey was dressed in blue jeans and a white blouse, and danced several chair routines with several male dancers. During the Charmbracelet Tour and Rainbow Tour, the shows segment was similar to her previous tour. The song was featured on the select set-list on three of Carey's live taped shows, Fantasy: Mariah Carey at Madison Square Garden, The Adventures of Mimi, and Around the World.

Legacy 

"Fantasy" exemplified how a music sample could be transformed "into a fully realized pop masterpiece". Due to the success and influence of the song, Carey is credited for introducing R&B and hip hop collaboration into mainstream pop culture, and for popularizing rap as a featuring act through her post-1995 songs. Sasha Frere-Jones, editor of The New Yorker commented in referencing to the song's remix,
"It became standard for R&B/hip-hop stars like Missy Elliott and Beyoncé, to combine melodies with rapped verses. And young white pop stars—including Britney Spears, 'N Sync, and Christina Aguilera—have spent much of the past ten years making pop music that is unmistakably R&B". Moreover, Jones concludes that "Her idea of pairing a female songbird with the leading male MCs of hip-hop changed R&B and, eventually, all of pop. Although now anyone is free to use this idea, the success of "Mimi" [ref. to The Emancipation of Mimi, her tenth studio album released almost a decade after "Fantasy"] suggests that it still belongs to Carey."

John Norris of MTV News has stated that the remix was "responsible for, I would argue, an entire wave of music that we've seen since and that is the R&B-hip-hop collaboration. You could argue that the 'Fantasy' remix was the single most important recording that she's ever made." Norris echoed the sentiments of TLC's Lisa Lopes, who told MTV that it's because of Mariah that we have "Hip-Pop." Judnick Mayard, writer of TheFader, wrote that in regarding of R&B and hip hop collaboration, "The champion of this movement is Mariah Carey." Mayard also expressed that "To this day ODB and Mariah may still be the best and most random hip hop collaboration of all time", citing that due to the record "Fantasy", "R&B and Hip Hop were the best of step siblings."

The song has been featured in multiple films and television shows. In the 1998 film Rush Hour, the character Soo Yong sings the song while it plays on the car radio, shortly before her kidnapping. In 2011, the experimental metal band Iwrestledabearonce used the song at the beginning and end of the video "You Know That Ain't Them Dogs' Real Voices". Indie artist Grimes has called "Fantasy" one of her favorite songs of all-time and has said Mariah is the reason there is a Grimes. In 2019, Carey released a video of her doing a dance to the 'Bad Boy Fantasy' mix on TikTok, thus leading the dance to become another famous TikTok dance challenge, preceding the Obsessed Challenge earlier in the year. A remixed version of the song, with additional vocals from Jodie Comer, features prominently as part of the score and the plot for the 2021 film Free Guy; in the film, Jodie Comer's character Molotov Girl catches the attention of Ryan Reynolds's character Guy as she is singing the song, thus catalyzing the rest of the story. Reynolds, who produced and starred in the film, stated that, "I am a huge Mariah Carey fan [...] It really was one of those weird things that happened naturally. I write to music anyway, and I initially put a song in the script by The Outfield called "Your Love". It’s an old '80s tune. It's great, but it just didn’t have that epic scale I was looking for. And then "Fantasy" just came on my playlist and everything clicked in". "Fantasy" was also included on the 2021 edition of Rolling Stone magazine's list of "The 500 Greatest Songs of All Time" at number 419.

Upon release, "Fantasy" also won many prestigious awards throughout the music industry in 1995 and 1996. At the Blockbuster Entertainment Awards, the song won the award for "Favorite Single." Additionally, the song was awarded the "Pop Award" honor at the 1996 annual American Society of Composers, Authors and Publishers (ASCAP). Carey won the "Dance Record of the Year" award at the "National Dance Music Awards" in 1996. "Fantasy" won two awards at the 1996 "Winter Music Conference National Dance Music Awards," for "Favorite Single" and "Dance Record of the Year." The song won a Broadcast Music Incorporated (BMI) "Pop Song of the Year" award in 1997, as well as the "Favorite Single" award at the annual "Archer Awards." The song also was nominated for Best Female Pop Vocal Performance at the 38th Grammy Awards.

Track listing and formats 

Worldwide CD single
 "Fantasy" – 4:04
 "Fantasy" (Bad Boy) Featuring O.D.B. – 4:53

UK #1/US CD maxi-single
 "Fantasy" (Album Version) – 4:06
 "Fantasy" (Bad Boy Fantasy) – 4:51
 "Fantasy" (Bad Boy) Featuring O.D.B. – 4:52
 "Fantasy" (Bad Boy Mix) – 4:14
 "Fantasy" (Def Club Mix) – 11:15

UK CD maxi-single #2
 "Fantasy" (MC Mix) – 6:29
 "Fantasy" (Puffy's Mix) – 4:53
 "Fantasy" (Puffy's Club Mix) – 4:49
 "Fantasy" (The Boss Dub) – 8:53
 "Fantasy" (Sweet Dub Mix) – 8:11

2× 12-inch vinyl
A1. "Fantasy" (Def Club Mix) – 11:14
A2. "Fantasy" (MC Mix) – 6:26
B1. "Fantasy" (Puffy's Mix) – 4:51
B2. "Fantasy" (Bad Boy) Featuring O.D.B. – 4:52
B3. "Fantasy" (Album Version) – 4:06
C1. "Fantasy" (The Boss Mix) — 8:51
C2. "Fantasy" (Sweet Dub Mix) — 8:11
D1. "Fantasy" (Puffy's Club Mix) — 4:48
D2. "Fantasy" (Bad Boy Mix) — 4:13

Fantasy EP
 "Fantasy" (feat. O.D.B.) – 4:53
 "Fantasy" (feat. O.D.B. - Bad Boy Fantasy) – 4:51
 "Fantasy" (Bad Boy Mix) – 4:14
 "Fantasy" (Puffy's Club Mix) – 4:50
 "Fantasy" (Def Radio Mix) – 3:46
 "Fantasy" (Def Club Mix) – 11:15
 "Fantasy" (MC Mix) – 6:28
 "Fantasy" (The Boss Mix) – 8:52
 "Fantasy" (Def Drums Mix) – 4:00
 "Fantasy" (Sweet Dub Mix) – 8:13
 "Fantasy" (Live at Madison Square Garden – October 1995) – 4:31

Credits and personnel 
Credits adapted from the Daydream liner notes.
 Mariah Carey – co-production, songwriting, vocals
 Dave Hall – co-production, songwriting
 Tina Weymouth – songwriting
 Chris Frantz – songwriting
 Steven Stanley – songwriting
 Adrian Belew – songwriting

Charts

Certifications and sales

Release history

References 

Works cited

 
 
 

1995 singles
1995 songs
Mariah Carey songs
Billboard Hot 100 number-one singles
Number-one singles in Australia
RPM Top Singles number-one singles
Number-one singles in New Zealand
American dance-pop songs
Music videos directed by Mariah Carey
Songs written by Mariah Carey
Songs written by Dave Hall (record producer)
Songs written by Adrian Belew
Songs written by Chris Frantz
Songs written by Tina Weymouth
Songs written by Steven Stanley
Song recordings produced by Dave Hall (record producer)
Sony Music singles
Columbia Records singles